A Blueprint for Murder is a 1953 American film noir thriller film directed and written by Andrew L. Stone and starring Joseph Cotten, Jean Peters and Gary Merrill.

Plot
Whitney "Cam" Cameron (Joseph Cotten) arrives at a hospital to be with his widowed sister-in-law Lynne (Jean Peters), whose stepdaughter Polly has died under mysterious circumstances. A doctor cannot determine the cause of the child's death.

Cam has great affection for his young nephew Doug (Freddy Ridgeway). He begins to fear for the boy's life when Maggie Sargent (Catherine McLeod), the wife of his lawyer, Fred (Gary Merrill), mentions that the dead girl's symptoms sound suspiciously as if she had been poisoned.

Fred reveals that the will of Cam's brother, who also died from unspecified causes, put all his money into a trust for the boy. Lynne would inherit it all if anything happened to Doug.

Police, prodded by Cam, exhume the girl's body. Poison is found and Lynne is brought to court, but a judge dismisses the charges for a lack of evidence against her.

A desperate Cam cannot think of any way to keep Doug safe, particularly once Lynne decides to take the boy away to Europe for at least a year. Cam surprises them by turning up on the ocean voyage. He begins romancing Lynne, all the while plotting to poison her.

He slips a tablet from her belongings into a cocktail. Lynne goes to great lengths to castigate Cam for his suspicions and demonstrate that the tablet contained nothing but aspirin. Cam leaves her stateroom, but a few minutes later Lynne's life is saved by the ship's doctor, proving that she did indeed possess poison. A court soon sentences Lynne to prison for life.

Cast
 Joseph Cotten as Whitney 'Cam' Cameron
 Jean Peters as Lynne Cameron
 Gary Merrill as Fred Sargent
 Catherine McLeod as Maggie Sargent
 Jack Kruschen as Detective Lt. Harold Y. Cole
 Barney Phillips as Detective Capt. Pringle
 Freddy Ridgeway as Doug Cameron (as Fred Ridgeway)

Reception
The film received a mostly negative review in The New York Times upon its opening.  The film critic wrote, "Andrew Stone, the writer-director who flavored last season's The Steel Trap with such intriguing semi-documentary finesse, misses by a good mile in his latest case history, A Blueprint for Murder ... However, Mr. Stone's plodding fixation on conventionalized justice, redundantly stressed in the hero's narration, sidesteps any surprises along the way. Indeed, it loses conviction altogether before the climax, when he traps the culprit aboard an ocean liner, squiring her intended victim and enough strychnine—as Mr. Cotten accuses her, twice—to choke a horse. 'This farce', replies the understandably surly Miss Peters, 'has gone on long enough.'"

Recently, Craig Butler of AllMovie was more positive. He writes "A Blueprint for Murder is a moderately entertaining crime thriller ... A bit more imagination would have brought a higher level of excitement to the film. However, Blueprint does benefit from a fine cast ... there's enough going on in Blueprint to make up for many of its flaws."

References

External links

 
 
 
 
 

1953 films
1950s crime thriller films
American crime thriller films
American black-and-white films
American detective films
Film noir
Films directed by Andrew L. Stone
Films scored by Leigh Harline
Poisoning in film
1950s English-language films
1950s American films